The Australian Health Practitioner Regulation Agency (AHPRA), infrequently spelt as the Australian Health Practitioners Regulation Agency is a statutory authority founded in 2010 which is responsible, in collaboration with the Medical Board of Australia, for registration and accreditation of health professionals as set out in the Australian legislation called the National Registration and Accreditation Scheme. , approximately 586,000 health professionals were registered with the AHPRA, containing 98,400 medical practitioners (which includes general practitioners, medical specialists and some hospital workers), and 334,000 nurses and midwives. This rose to 825,720 registered health professionals in 2021.

The AHPRA is intended to facilitate public safety of health practice in Australia, and is used to assess the qualifications of overseas health practitioners. According to the National Registration and Accreditation Scheme, it is required to be registered with the AHPRA to self-identify with one of the "protected titles" set out in the legislation, and it is an offence to do so without registration. The AHPRA maintains a public register of those registered and related qualifications accessible from their website. The AHPRA is responsible for hearing and investigating complaints (which are legally termed "notifications") of "performance, health and conduct" by those registered. The AHPRA is also responsible for hearing complaints about unregistered professions, which includes "unregistered health care workers who provide a health service", in violation of the National Code of Conduct for health care workers by behaving in an incompetent, exploitative, predatory or illegal manner.

Martin Fletcher has been the chief executive officer of the AHPRA since its inception. According to a 2011 publication, "Australia  the first country in the world to have a national registration and accreditation scheme regulating health practitioners."

Regulated professions 
, the AHPRA regulates 16 medical professions in Australia. 12 of these were enacted under the National Registration and Accreditation Scheme on 1 July 2010, listed exactly as:

 Chiropractors
 Dental practitioners (including dentists, dental hygienists, dental prosthetists, and dental therapists)
 Medical practitioners
 Nurses and midwives
 Optometrists
 Osteopaths
 Pharmacists
 Physiotherapists
 Podiatrists
 Psychologists

In July 2012, this was expanded to include 4 additional professions:

 Aboriginal and Torres Strait Islander health practitioners
 Chinese medicine practitioners (including acupuncturists, Chinese herbal medicine practitioners and Chinese herbal dispensers)
 Medical radiation practitioners (including diagnostic radiographers, radiation therapists and nuclear medicine technologists)
 Occupational therapists

The set of "protected titles" also includes common variations on these profession titles. , the following professions are not regulated by, and do not have "protected titles", under the National Registration and Accreditation Scheme:

 Social workers
 Speech pathologists
 Dieticians
 Audiologists
 Sonographers
 Orthotic prosthetists
 Perfusionists
 Exercise and sport scientists

, although there exists guidelines under the AHPRA for "medical practitioners who perform cosmetic medical and surgical procedures", the term "surgeon" and related terms like "cosmetic surgeon" are not "protected titles". This meant that registered medical practitioners in Australia could these titles even when having different training and qualifications. A public consultation about this began on 1 December 2021 via Engage Victoria, an online platform run by the Victoria government department of health, which closed feedback submissions on 1 April 2022.

Each regulated health profession is represented by a national board, of which there are 15, along with 21 specialist organisations.

Registration 
There are four categories of registration conducted through the Medical Board of Australia, depending on training and expertise, including "general", "specialist", "provisional", "limited" and "non-practicing", along with a student registration. Medical graduates applying from New Zealand are treated with the same registration standards as Australians, differing from the international registration process. , there are separate fees for both registration and application. Initial registration and application fees for general, specialist and limited registrations is $835 AUD, with some categories of New South Wales registrations receiving rebates.

The registration process includes a criminal history check, where individuals must inform the national board under application jurisdiction if they have been "charged with an offence punishable by 12 months imprisonment or more, or convicted or found guilty of an offence punishable by imprisonment in Australia and/or overseas". There exists a dispute resolution process with the Australian Criminal Intelligence Commission and relevant police departments, if the result of a criminal history check prevents registration under the AHPRA.

Complaint process 
In the AHPRA, complaints are termed "notifications". The complaints process includes several stages, which may advance a stage, result in disciplinary action, a fast-track process called "immediate action", or the complaint may be dropped. The stages include a receipt of the complaint, preliminary assessment, investigation, panel hearing, and a tribunal hearing, and at any stage of the process the complaint to advance immediately to a tribunal hearing. Unlike the other stages, a tribunal hearing outcome is made to the public, and a tribunal typically consists of "a District Court judge, two medical practitioners and a lay person, specifically appointed to consider the evidence".

According to AHPRA, in 2021 there were 10,147 notifications about 7,858 health practitioners, and 1.6% of those registered were the subject of a complaint. According to Sharon Russell, "many medical practitioners will be the subject of an AHPRA complaint at some stage during their career".

Complaints can be made online via the AHPRA website, by mail, telephone or attending an office. There is also a whistleblower policy governed under the Public Interest Disclosure Act 2013 where anonymous complaints can be made for serious misconduct.

Criticism 
The AHPRA has been subject to criticism, including for medical right to privacy and informed consent of those registered, and the long amount of time taken to resolve complaints. There was an investigation in 2014 following complaints to the AHPRA about how complaints are managed, including a lack of transparency over the complaint review process, and delays in investigations, with one case taking 2,368 days to resolve. There have been senate inquiries (see Australian Senate committees) by the Parliament of Australia in 2011, 2017 and 2021 over related issues. The 2021 public submission of support from the Royal Australian College of General Practitioners identified the main issues with the AHPRA as being "communication, transparency and timeliness of the complaints mechanism, and the importance of appropriate recognition of the impacts of assessment and investigation on a practitioner’s mental health".

Submissions for the 2021 senate inquiry were extended to March 2022, with the final senate report being released on 1 April 2022. The senate inquiry resulted in 14 recommendations, including improving the complaints process, more flexible re-registration after a period of absence, and the regulation of surgeons, social workers, aged care workers and personal care workers along with adding these professions to the list of "protected titles".

External links 

 National Code of Conduct for health care workers
 AHPRA Regulatory Guide - June 2022
 AHPRA Regulatory Guide Overview - June 2020
 Health Practitioner Regulation National Law Act 2009, the legislation governing the National Registration and Accreditation Scheme, current to at least 1 August 2018

References 

Regulatory authorities of Australia
2010 establishments in Australia
Medical and health regulators